The Senu River languages are a small language family spoken in the Senu River watershed of Papua New Guinea.
They consist at least of the Kwomtari languages, Kwomtari and Nai, with several additional languages more distantly related to them.

Classification
The family consists of at least the two relatively closely related languages Kwomtari and Nai.

Baron (1983)
Baron adds the highly divergent language Guriaso:

Kwomtari stock
Guriaso
Kwomtari–Nai family (Nuclear Kwomtari)
Kwomtari
Nai ( Biaka)

Guriaso shares a small number of cognates with Kwomtari–Nai.

* Compare Biaka .

** Metathesis of /p/ and /t/.

Usher (2020)
Usher further classifies Yale (Nagatman) with Guriaso, and adds Busa, all under the name "Senu River".

Senu River (Kwomtari–Busa)
Kwomtari–Nai
Guriaso–Yale
Odiai (Busa)

Confusion from Laycock
There has been confusion over the membership of the Kwomtari family, apparently due to a misalignment in the publication (Loving & Bass 1964) of the data used for the initial classification. (See Baron 1983.) Because of this, Laycock classified the Kwomtari languages as part of a spurious Kwomtari–Fas family, which confusingly was also often called "Kwomtari" in the literature. However, Baron sees no evidence that the similarities are due to relationship. Usher likewise discounts the inclusion of the Fas languages. See Kwomtari–Fas languages for details.

References

External links
Kwomtari languages database at TransNewGuinea.org
Wietze Baron, The Kwomtari Phylum (accessed 2011-4-15)

 
Language families
Languages of Sandaun Province